HMS Reindeer was a Royal Navy wooden-hulled screw-driven sloop of the , in service from 1866 to 1876.  In 1868 she claimed Caroline Island for the British Crown.

References
 

 

Camelion-class sloops
Victorian-era sloops of the United Kingdom
1866 ships